Sugartree Creek is a  long 1st order tributary to South Hyco Creek in Caswell County, North Carolina.

Course
Sugartree Creek rises in a pond in Prospect Hill, North Carolina and then flows northeast to join South Hyco Creek about 1 mile northwest of Gordonton.

Watershed
Sugartree Creek drains  of area, receives about 46.6 in/year of precipitation, has a wetness index of 385.73, and is about 58% forested.

References

Rivers of North Carolina
Rivers of Caswell County, North Carolina
Tributaries of the Roanoke River